Prevention Point Philadelphia (PPP) was the first syringe exchange program in Philadelphia and Eastern Pennsylvania. Prevention Point Pittsburgh is the only other syringe exchange program in the state. The two organizations are not affiliated.

Prevention Point Philadelphia provides harm reduction counseling, syringe exchange, free medical care, support and education groups, and referrals to social services and drug treatment. The organization distributes syringes six days a week. Locations include the main office in Kensington, Philadelphia, Pennsylvania, and five sites served by a mobile unit.

About

Mission 
To reduce the harm associated with substance use and sex industry work by promoting health, empowerment and safety while advocating for humane public policies and programs.

History 
Prevention Point Philadelphia was founded in 1991 by a group of ACT UP Philadelphia activists in response to the HIV & AIDS epidemic. That year, injected drug use was the most common risk category for people being diagnosed with HIV infection. At the time, it was illegal to distribute syringes/needles in Pennsylvania, and the activists risked jail time for their work.

Under increasing pressure to respond to the growing epidemic, Mayor Ed Rendell issued an executive order on July 27, 1992, authorizing the legal distribution of syringes, and establishment of a citywide institution to manage the program. That program became Prevention Point Philadelphia.

Services 
 Sterile syringe exchange
 Overdose prevention program
 Stabilization, Treatment and Engagement Program (STEP)
 Computer Lab

References

External links
 

HIV/AIDS prevention organizations
Organizations based in Philadelphia
Medical and health organizations based in Pennsylvania
HIV/AIDS activism
Drug culture
Harm reduction
Kensington, Philadelphia
1991 establishments in Pennsylvania